Robert John McFarlin, Sr. (December 3, 1929 – September 24, 2017) was an American politician and a civil engineer.

McFarlin was born in Easton, Pennsylvania. He graduated from the University of Delaware in 1951 and University of North Dakota in 1956 with bachelor's degrees in civil engineering. He served in the Minnesota House of Representatives for District 30B from 1967 to 1970, and for District 41B in 1973 to 1974. McFarlin lived with his wife and family in St. Louis Park, Minnesota and work as a consulting and civil engineer. McFarlin died on September 24, 2017 in Duluth, Minnesota.

References

1929 births
2017 deaths
Members of the Minnesota House of Representatives
Politicians from Easton, Pennsylvania
People from St. Louis Park, Minnesota
University of Delaware alumni
University of North Dakota alumni
American civil engineers
Engineers from Pennsylvania